Charles Owens may refer to:

 Charles Owens (golfer), American golfer
 Charles Owens (tennis), American tennis player
 Charles Owens (saxophonist born 1939)
 Charles John Owens, British railway manager
 Charles L. Owens, first African-American judge in Oklahoma
 Tinker Owens (Charles Wayne Owens), American football player

See also
 Charlie Owens (disambiguation)